Moherowe Berety was released in 2006 by Universal Music Polska. The cover of the album legally sold bearing a sticker with the slogan "CD banned in the Fourth Republic". In addition to the 12 tracks on the album, a video for the title song Moherowe Berety was recorded, funded by Sabina Kluszczyński of Heavy Vision.

Track listing
 Atakują Klony (Clones Attack)
 Moherowe Berety (Mohair Berets)
 Złodzieje (Thieves)
 Mówi Bagdad (Baghdad speaks) 
 Tajni Agenci (Secret Agents)
 I Ty Będziesz Miał 40 Lat (And you'll be 40 years old)
 Pechowy Jak Polak (Unlucky Like a Pole)
 Dyktator (Dictator)
 Bazooka 
 Błysk (Flash)
 Mój Komputer (My Computer)
 Granice (Borders)

References

Big Cyc albums
2006 albums